There is no universal agreement on the legal definition of terrorism,  although there exists a consensus academic definition created by scholars.

Various legal systems and government agencies use different definitions of terrorism, and governments have been reluctant to formulate and agreed-upon a legally binding definition. Difficulties arise from the fact that the term has become politically and emotionally charged. A simple definition proposed to the United Nations Commission on Crime Prevention and Criminal Justice (CCPCJ) by terrorism studies scholar Alex P. Schmid in 1992, based on the already internationally accepted definition of war crimes, as "peacetime equivalents of war crimes", was not accepted.

Scholars have worked on creating various academic definitions, reaching a consensus definition published by Schmid and A. J. Jongman in 1988, with a longer revised version published by Schmid in 2011, some years after he had written that "the price for consensus [had] led to a reduction of complexity".

The United Nations General Assembly condemned terrorist acts by using the following political description of terrorism in December 1994 (GA Res. 49/60):
Criminal acts intended or calculated to provoke a state of terror in the general public, a group of persons or particular persons for political purposes are in any circumstance unjustifiable, whatever the considerations of a political, philosophical, ideological, racial, ethnic, religious or any other nature that may be invoked to justify them.

In the  United States of America, terrorism is defined in Title 22 Chapter 38, of the U.S. Code as "premeditated, politically motivated violence perpetrated against noncombatant targets by subnational groups or clandestine agents".

Etymology 

The  was a panic and state of emergency in Rome in response to the approach of warriors of the Cimbri tribe in 105 BCE.

The French National Convention declared in September 1793 that "terror is the order of the day". Maximilien Robespierre, a leader in the French revolution proclaimed in 1794 that "Terror is nothing other than justice, prompt, severe, inflexible."
The Committee of Public Safety agents that enforced the policies of "The Terror" were referred to as "Terrorists". The word "terrorism" was first recorded in English-language dictionaries in 1798 as meaning "systematic use of terror as a policy".

Although the Reign of Terror was imposed by the French government, in modern times "terrorism" usually refers to the killing of people by non-governmental political activists for political reasons, often as a public statement. This meaning originated with Russian radicals in the 1870s. Sergey Nechayev, who founded the People's Reprisal (Народная расправа) in 1869, described himself as a "terrorist". German radicalist writer Johann Most helped popularize the modern sense of the word by dispensing "advice for terrorists" in the 1880s.

According to Myra Williamson (2009): "The meaning of "terrorism" has undergone a transformation. During the reign of terror a regime or system of terrorism was used as an instrument of governance, wielded by a recently established revolutionary state against the enemies of the people. Now the term "terrorism" is commonly used to describe terrorist acts committed by non-state or subnational entities against a state".

General criteria
Terrorism has been described as:
 The use of violence or of the threat of violence in the pursuit of political, religious, ideological or social objectives
 Acts committed by non-state actors (or by undercover personnel serving on the behalf of their respective governments) 
 Acts reaching more than the immediate target victims and also directed at targets consisting of a larger spectrum of society 
 Both mala prohibita (i.e., crime that is made illegal by legislation) and mala in se (i.e., crime that is inherently immoral or wrong)

The following criteria of violence or threat of violence usually fall outside of the definition of terrorism:
 Wartime (including a declared war) or peacetime acts of violence committed by a nation state against another nation state regardless of legality or illegality and are carried out by properly uniformed forces or legal combatants of such nation states
 Reasonable acts of self-defense, such as the use of force to kill, apprehend, or punish criminals who pose a threat to the lives of humans or property
 Legitimate targets in war, such as enemy combatants and strategic infrastructure that form an integral part of the enemy's war effort such as defense industries and ports
 Collateral damage, including the infliction of incidental damage to non-combatant targets during an attack on or attempting to attack legitimate targets in war

In international law

The need to define terrorism in international criminal law
Schmid (2004) summarised many sources when he wrote: "It is widely agreed that international terrorism can only be fought by international cooperation". If states do not agree on what constitutes terrorism, the chances of cooperation between countries is reduced; for example, agreement is needed so that extradition is possible.

Ben Saul has noted (2008): "A combination of pragmatic and principled arguments supports the case for defining terrorism in international law". Reasons for why terrorism needs to be defined by the international community include the need to condemn violations to human rights; to protect the state and its constitutional orders which protects rights; to differentiate public and private violence; to ensure international peace and security, and "control the operation of mandatory Security Council measures since 2001".

Carlos Diaz-Paniagua, who coordinated the negotiations of the proposed United Nations Comprehensive Convention on International Terrorism (proposed in 1996 and note yet achieved), noted (2008) the need to provide a precise definition of terrorist activities in international law: "Criminal law has three purposes: to declare that a conduct is forbidden, to prevent it, and to express society's condemnation for the wrongful acts.  The symbolic, normative role of criminalization is of particular importance in the case of terrorism.  The criminalization of terrorist acts expresses society's repugnance at them, invokes social censure and shame, and stigmatizes those who commit them.  Moreover, by creating and reaffirming values, criminalization may serve, in the long run, as a deterrent to terrorism, as those values are internalized." Thus, international criminal law treaties that seek to prevent, condemn and punish terrorist activities, require precise definitions:

Saul noted in this sense that, missing a generally agreed, all-encompassing, definition of the term:

Obstacles to a comprehensive definition
There are many reasons for the failure to achieve universal consensus regarding the definition of terrorism, not least that it is such a "complex and multidimensional phenomenon". In addition, the term has been used broadly, to describe so many different incidents and events that scholar Louise Richardson has said that the term "has become so widely used in many contexts as to become almost meaningless". An analysis of 73 different definitions in 2004 came up with only five common elements, which excluded any reference to victims, fear/terror, motive, non-combatant targets or the criminal nature of the tactics used.

Historically, the dispute on the meaning of terrorism arose since the laws of war were first codified in 1899. The Martens Clause was introduced as a compromise wording for the dispute between the Great Powers who considered francs-tireurs to be unlawful combatants subject to execution on capture, and smaller states who maintained that they should be considered lawful combatants.

More recently the 1977 Protocol Additional to the Geneva Conventions of 12 August 1949, and relating to the Protection of Victims of International Armed Conflicts, which applies in situations Article 1. Paragraph 4 "... in which peoples are fighting against colonial domination and alien occupation and against racist regimes...", contains many ambiguities that cloud the issue of who is or is not a legitimate combatant.

In a briefing paper for the Australian Parliament in 2002, Angus Martyn resported that "[t]he international community [had] never succeeded in developing an accepted comprehensive definition of terrorism. During the 1970s and 1980s, the United Nations attempts to define the term foundered mainly due to differences of opinion between various members about the use of violence in the context of conflicts over national liberation and self-determination." These divergences have made it impossible to conclude a Comprehensive Convention on International Terrorism that incorporates a single, all-encompassing, legally binding, criminal-law definition of terrorism. In the meantime, the international community adopted a series of sectoral conventions that define and criminalize various types of terrorist activities.

Diaz-Paniagua (2008) has noted that, to "create an effective legal regime against terrorism, it would be necessary to formulate a comprehensive definition of that crime that, on the one hand, provides the strongest moral condemnation to terrorist activities while, on the other hand, has enough precision to permit the prosecution of criminal activities without condemning acts that should be deemed to be legitimate".  Nonetheless, due to major divergences at the international level on the question of the legitimacy of the use of violence for political purposes, either by states or by self-determination and revolutionary groups, this has not yet been possible." In this sense, M. Cherif Bassiouni (1988) notes:

Sami Zeidan, a diplomat and scholar, explained the political reasons underlying the current difficulties to define terrorism as follows (2004):

In the same vein, Jason Burke (2003), a British reporter who writes about radical Islamist activity, said:

The political and emotional connotation of the term "terrorism" makes difficult its use in legal discourse. In this sense, Saul (2004) notes that: 

As scholar Bruce Hoffman (1998) has noted: "terrorism is a pejorative term. It is a word with intrinsically negative connotations that is generally applied to one's enemies and opponents, or to those with whom one disagrees and would otherwise prefer to ignore. (...) Hence the decision to call someone or label some organization 'terrorist' becomes almost unavoidably subjective, depending largely on whether one sympathizes with or opposes the person/group/cause concerned. If one identifies with the victim of the violence, for example, then the act is terrorism. If, however, one identifies with the perpetrator, the violent act is regarded in a more sympathetic, if not positive (or, at the worst, an ambivalent) light; and it is not terrorism." For this and for political reasons, many news sources (such as Reuters) avoid using this term, opting instead for less accusatory words like "bombers", "militants", etc.

The term has been depicted as carrying racist, xenophobic and ethnocentric connotations when used as an ethnic slur aimed at Arabs or Middle Easterners, or at someone of Arab or Greater Middle Eastern descent or when used by white supremacists.

These difficulties led Pamala Griset (2003) to conclude that: "the meaning of terrorism is embedded in a person's or nation's philosophy. Thus, the determination of the 'right' definition of terrorism is subjective".

The sectoral approach
To elaborate an effective legal regime to prevent and punish international terrorism—rather than only working on a single, all-encompassing, comprehensive definition of terrorism—the international community has also adopted a "...'sectoral' approach aimed at identifying offences seen as belonging to the activities of terrorists and working out treaties in order to deal with specific categories thereof". The treaties that follow this approach focus on the wrongful nature of terrorist activities rather than on their intent:

Following this approach, the international community adopted 12 sectoral counter-terrorism conventions, open to the ratification of all states, between 1963 and 2005 (see below), relating to types of acts (such as aboard an aircraft, taking hostages, bombings, nuclar terrorism, etc.).

Analyzing these treaties, Andrew Byrnes observed that:

Byrnes notes that "this act-specific approach to addressing problems of terrorism in binding international treaties has continued up until relatively recently. Although political denunciation of terrorism in all its forms had continued apace, there had been no successful attempt to define 'terrorism' as such in a broad sense that was satisfactory for legal purposes. There was also some scepticism as to the necessity, desirability and feasibility of producing an agreed and workable general definition." Nonetheless, the same committee of the United Nations General Assembly which authored the 1997 Bombing Convention and the 1999 Financing Convention has been working on a proposed Comprehensive Convention on International Terrorism, given renewed impetus by the September 11 attacks in 2001.

Comprehensive conventions
The international community has worked on two comprehensive counter-terrorism treaties, the League of Nations' 1937 Convention for the Prevention and Punishment of Terrorism, which never entered into force, and the United Nations' proposed Comprehensive Convention on International Terrorism, which has not yet been finalized.

League of Nations (1930s)
In the late 1930s, the international community made a first attempt at defining terrorism. Article 1.1 of the League of Nations' 1937 Convention for the prevention and punishment of Terrorism defined "acts of terrorism" as "criminal acts directed against a State and intended or calculated to create a state of terror in the minds of particular persons or a group of persons or the general public". Article 2 included as terrorist acts, if they were directed against another state and if they constituted acts of terrorism within the meaning of the definition contained in article 1, the following:

These articles which never entered into force, owing to lack of support.

UN Comprehensive Convention (1997–present)

In 1996 an Ad Hoc Committee on Terrorism was set up, with the remit of drafting several conventions condemning various aspects of terrorism, with the intention of producing a final Comprehensive Convention which would either supplement or replace the series of sectoral conventions.

Since January 1997, the United Nations General Assembly has been negotiating a Comprehensive Convention on International Terrorism. The definition of the crime of terrorism on the negotiating table reads as follows (GA Resolution 51/210, Declaration to Supplement the 1994 Declaration on Measures to Eliminate International Terrorism, December 1996; adopted January 1997):

Among the negotiators, the 1996/7 definition is not controversial in itself; the deadlock in the negotiations arises instead  from the opposing views on whether such a definition would be applicable to the armed forces of a state and to self-determination movements. Thalif Deen described the situation as follows: "The key sticking points in the draft treaty revolve around several controversial yet basic issues, including the definition of ´terrorism´. For example, what distinguishes a "terrorist organisation" from a 'liberation movement'? And do you exclude activities of national armed forces, even if they are perceived to commit acts of terrorism? If not, how much of this constitutes 'state terrorism'?"

In 2002, the coordinator of the negotiations, supported by most western delegations, proposed the following exceptions to address those issues:

The state members of the Organisation of the Islamic Conference proposed instead the following exceptions:

Sectoral conventions (1963–2005)
The various sectoral counter-terrorism conventions, or treaties, define as terrorist particular categories of activities. These include:

 The 1963 Convention on Offences and Certain Other Acts Committed On Board Aircraft 
 The 1970 Convention for the Suppression of Unlawful Seizure of Aircraft 
 The 1971 Convention for the Suppression of Unlawful Acts against the Safety of Civil Aviation
 The 1979 International Convention against the Taking of Hostages  
 The 1979 Convention on the Physical Protection of Nuclear Material 
 The 1988 Protocol for the Suppression of Unlawful Acts of Violence at Airports Serving International Civil Aviation 
 The 1988 Convention for the Suppression of Unlawful Acts against the Safety of Maritime Navigation 
 The 1988 Protocol for the Suppression of Unlawful Acts against the Safety of Fixed Platforms Located on the Continental Shelf 
 The 1991 Convention on the Marking of Plastic Explosives for the Purpose of Identification 
 The 1997 International Convention for the Suppression of Terrorist Bombings 
 The 1999 International Convention for the Suppression of the Financing of Terrorism 
 The 2005 International Convention for the Suppression of Acts of Nuclear Terrorism

1997: Terrorist Bombings Convention

Article 2.1 of the 1997 International Convention for the Suppression of Terrorist Bombings defines the offence of terrorist bombing as follows:

Article 19 expressly excluded from the scope of the convention certain activities of state armed forces and of self-determination movements as follows:

1999: Terrorist Financing Convention

Article 2.1 of the 1999 sectoral United Nations International Convention for the Suppression of the Financing of Terrorism (Terrorist Financing Convention) defines the crime of terrorist financing as the offence committed by "any person" who "by any means, directly or indirectly, unlawfully and wilfully, provides or collects funds with the intention that they should be used or in the knowledge that they are to be used, in full or in part, in order to carry out" an act "intended to cause death or serious bodily injury to a civilian, or to any other person not taking an active part in the hostilities in a situation of armed conflict, when the purpose of such act, by its nature or context, is to intimidate a population, or to compel a government or an international organization to do or to abstain from doing any act."

2005: Nuclear Terrorism Convention

The 2005 United Nations International Convention for the Suppression of Acts of Nuclear Terrorism defines the crime of nuclear terrorism as follows:

Article 4 of the convention expressly excluded from the application of the convention the use of nuclear weapons during armed conflicts without, though, recognizing the legality of the use of those weapons:

Definitions of terrorism in other UN decisions
In parallel with the criminal law codification efforts, some United Nations organs have put forward some broad political definitions of terrorism.

The United Nations did not focus any debate on terrorism until 1972, after the terrorist attack at the Olympic Games in Munich.

UN General Assembly Resolutions (1972, 1994/6)
In 1972 the General Assembly passed a resolution titled "Measures to prevent international terrorism which endangers or takes innocent human lives or jeopardises fundamental freedoms, and study of the underlying causes of those forms of terrorism and acts ofviolence which lie in misery, frustration, grievance and despair, and which cause some people to sacrifice human lives, including their own, in an attempt to effect radical changes". An Ad Hoc Committee on International Terrorism, consisting of three sub-committees, was established, but no consensus was reached on the various draft proposals submitted, and the matter was again put aside until the Cold War had ended (1991).

In 1994, the General Assembly agreed on a declaration that terrorism was "criminal and unjustifiable", condemning all such acts "wherever and by whomever committed", in its Declaration on Measures to Eliminate International Terrorism (GA Res. 49/60).

A 1996 non-binding United Nations Declaration to Supplement the 1994 Declaration on Measures to Eliminate International Terrorism (which described terrorism as "Criminal acts intended or calculated to provoke a state of terror in the general public, a group of persons or particular persons for political purposes are in any circumstance unjustifiable, whatever the considerations of a political, philosophical, ideological, racial, ethnic, religious or any other nature that may be invoked to justify them") annexed to the UN General Assembly Resolution 51/210, described terrorist activities in the following terms:

Antonio Cassese has argued that the language of this and other similar UN declarations "sets out an acceptable definition of terrorism."

Each year, a legal committee of the General Assembly meets to discuss international cooperation to counter terrorism, and in 2019 the committee "reaffirmed the importance of the negotiations on and successful conclusion of the draft comprehensive convention on international terrorism" and the need for consensus for this and in particular stressed "the importance of negotiating an internationally agreed definition of terrorism".

UN Security Council (1999, 2004)
In 1999, the UN Security Council passed Resolution 1269 unanimously, which "unequivocally condemn[ed] all acts, methods and practices of terrorism as criminal and unjustifiable, regardless of their motivation".

In 2004, United Nations Security Council Resolution 1566 condemned terrorist acts as:

High-Level Panel (2004)

Also in 2004, a High-Level Panel on Threats, Challenges and Change composed of independent experts and convened by the Secretary-General of the United Nations called states to set aside their differences and to adopt, in the text of a proposed Comprehensive Convention on International Terrorism, the following political "description of terrorism":

The following year, Secretary-General of the United Nations Kofi Annan endorsed the High Level Panel's definition of terrorism and asked states to set aside their differences and to adopt that definition within the proposed comprehensive terrorism convention before the end of that year. He said:

The suggestion of incorporating this definition of terrorism into the comprehensive convention was rejected. Some United Nations' member states contended that a definition such as the one proposed by the High-Level Panel on Threats, Challenges and Change, and endorsed by the Secretary General, lacked the necessary requirements to be incorporated in a criminal law instrument. Diaz-Paniagua stated that a comprehensive definition of terrorism to be included in a criminal law treaty must have "legal precision, certainty, and fair-labeling of the criminal conduct - all of which emanate from the basic human rights obligation to observe due process".

European Union
The European Union defines terrorism for legal/official purposes in Art. 1 of the Framework Decision on Combating Terrorism (2002). This provides that terrorist offences are certain criminal offences set out in a list consisting largely of serious offences against persons and property that:

North Atlantic Treaty Organization
NATO defines terrorism in the AAP-06 NATO Glossary of Terms and Definitions, Edition 2019 as "The unlawful use or threatened use of force or violence, instilling fear and terror, against individuals or property in an attempt to coerce or intimidate governments or societies, or to gain control over a population, to achieve political, religious or ideological objectives".

In national law

Australia
, the Criminal Code Act 1995 (known as the Criminal Code), representing the federal government's criminal law and including Australia's laws against terrorism, defines "terrorist act" in Section 5.3. The definition, after defining in (a) the harms that may be caused (and excluding accidental harm or various actions undertaken as advocacy) defines a terrorist act as:

Within the Criminal Code, a variety of offences are defined with reference to the definition of a terrorist act, for example financing terrorism, activities which advocate violent terrorist acts, etc.

Argentina
The Argentine National Reorganization Process dictatorship, which lasted from 1976 to 1983, defined "terrorist" as "not only who set bombs and carry guns, but also those who spread ideas opposite to Christian and western civilization".

Brazil 
In 2016, Brazil passed a law that defines acts of terrorism and establishes punishment for committing, planning, enabling, sponsoring, inciting and participating in terrorist acts. The bill lists a series of acts that provoke social and general terror or endanger people, property, infrastructure, or public peace, for reasons of xenophobia, discrimination or prejudice of race, color, ethnicity and religion. Shortly after the creation of the law, Federal Police's Operation Hashtag arrested eleven suspects of planning a terrorist attack in the run-up to the 2016 Olympics in Rio de Janeiro.

Canada 
In Canada, section 83.01 of the Criminal Code defines terrorism as an act committed "in whole or in part for a political, religious or ideological purpose, objective or cause" with the objective of intimidating the public "with regard to its security, including its economic security, or compelling a person, a government or a domestic or an international organization to do or to refrain from doing any act."

France 
In 1986, France adopted its first "anti-terrorism" law. The French legal definition of "acts of terrorism" as in force since 2016 is to be found in the French Code pénal, article 421. The article starts with:

India
The Supreme Court of India quoted Alex P. Schmid's definition of terrorism in a 2003 ruling (Madan Singh vs. State of Bihar), "defin[ing] acts of terrorism veritably as 'peacetime equivalents of war crimes.'"

The now lapsed Terrorist and Disruptive Activities (Prevention) Act specified the following definition of terrorism:

Pakistan
The Pakistan Anti-Terrorism (Amendment) Ordinance, 1999 states:

A person is said to commit a terrorist act if he,

(a) in order to, or if the effect of his actions will be to, strike terror or create a sense of fear and insecurity in the people, or any section of the people, does any act or thing by using bombs, dynamite or other explosive or inflammable substances, or such fire-arms or other lethal weapons as may be notified, or poisons or noxious gases or chemicals, in such a manner as to cause, or be likely to cause, the death of, or injury to, any person or persons, or damage to, or destruction of, property on a large scale, or a widespread disruption of supplies of services essential to the life of the community, or threatens with the use of force public servants in order to prevent them from discharging their lawful duties; or

(b) commits a scheduled offence, the effect of which will be, or be likely to be, to strike terror, or create a sense of fear and insecurity in the people, or any section of the people, or to adversely affect harmony among different sections of the people; or

(c) commits an act of gang rape, child molestation, or robbery coupled with rape as specified in the Schedule to this Act; or

(d) commits an act of civil commotion as specified in section &A."

Philippines 
The Anti-Terrorism Act of 2020, officially designated as Republic Act No. 11479, is a counter-terrorism law intended to prevent, prohibit, and penalize terrorism in the Philippines. The law was passed by the 18th Congress and signed by President Rodrigo Duterte on July 3, 2020, effectively replacing the Human Security Act of 2007 on July 18, 2020.

The Act defines terrorism as:

 Engaging in acts intended to cause death or serious bodily injury to any person or endangers a person's life;
 Engaging in acts intended to cause extensive damage or destruction to a government or public facility, public place, or private property;
 Engaging in acts intended to cause extensive interference with, damage, or destruction to critical infrastructure;
 Developing, manufacturing, possessing, acquiring, transporting, supplying, or using weapons; and
 Releasing dangerous substances or causing fire, floods or explosions when the purpose is to intimidate the general public, create an atmosphere to spread a message of fear, provoke or influence by intimidation the government or any international organization, seriously destabilize or destroy the fundamental political, economic, or social structures in the country, or create a public emergency or seriously undermine public safety.

The definition states that "advocacy, protest, dissent, stoppage of work, industrial or mass action, and other similar exercises of civil and political rights" shall not be considered as terrorist acts only if they "are not intended to cause death or serious physical harm to a person, to endanger a person's life, or to create a serious risk to public safety."

Saudi Arabia
Saudi Interior Ministry issued a set of anti-terrorist laws in 2014. According to Article 1 and 2:

“Calling for atheist thought in any form, or calling into question the fundamentals of the Islamic religion on which this country is based” and anyone who questions the King or the government or supports any group, party, organization other than that of the ruling elite inside or outside the Kingdom is a terrorist.

Syria
After the United States attack on Abu Kamal, the Syrian Foreign Minister Walid Muallem defined terrorism as "Killing civilians in international law means a terrorist aggression."

Turkey
The definition of "Terrorism" in Article 1 of Anti-Terror Law 3713 is: "Terrorism is any kind of act done by one or more persons belonging to an organization with the aim of changing the characteristics of the Republic as specified in the Constitution, its political, legal, social, secular and economic system, damaging the indivisible unity of the State with its territory and nation, endangering the existence of the Turkish State and Republic, weakening or destroying or seizing the authority of the State, eliminating fundamental rights and freedoms, or damaging the internal and external security of the State, public order or general health by means of pressure, force and violence, terror, intimidation, oppression or threat."

United Kingdom
The United Kingdom's Terrorism Act 2000 defined terrorism as follows:

Section 34 of the Terrorism Act 2006 amended sections 1(1)(b) and 113(1)(c) of Terrorism Act 2000 to include "international governmental organisations" in addition to "government".

Successive Independent Reviewers of Terrorism Legislation (most recently in a report of July 2014) have commented on the UK's definition of terrorism.

United States

U.S. Code (U.S.C.)
Title 22, Chapter 38, Section 2656f, of the United States Code (regarding the Department of State) contains a definition of terrorism in its requirement that annual country reports on terrorism be submitted by the Secretary of State to Congress every year. It reads:

Title 18 of the United States Code (regarding criminal acts and criminal procedure) defines international terrorism as:

Commenting on the genesis of this provision, Edward Peck, former U.S. Chief of Mission in Iraq (under Jimmy Carter) and former ambassador to Mauritania said:

U.S. Code of Federal Regulations
The U.S. Code of Federal Regulations defines terrorism as "the unlawful use of force and violence against persons or property to intimidate or coerce a government, the civilian population, or any segment thereof, in furtherance of political or social objectives" (28 C.F.R. Section 0.85).

U.S. Department of Defense
The U.S. Department of Defense recently changed its definition of terrorism. Per Joint Pub 3-07.2, Antiterrorism, (24 November 2010), the Department of Defense defines it as "the unlawful use of violence or threat of violence to instill fear and coerce governments or societies. Terrorism is often motivated by religious, political, or other ideological beliefs and committed in the pursuit of goals that are usually political."

The new definition distinguishes between motivations for terrorism (religion, ideology, etc.) and goals of terrorism ("usually political"). This is in contrast to the previous definition which stated that the goals could be religious in nature.

U.S. Federal Emergency Management Agency
The U.S. Federal Emergency Management Agency (FEMA) contains a definition of terrorism, which reads:

The new definition does not require that the act needs to be politically motivated. The FEMA also said that terrorism "include threats of terrorism; assassinations; kidnappings; hijackings; bomb scares and bombings; cyber attacks (computer-based); and the use of chemical, biological, nuclear and radiological weapons" and also states that "[h]igh-risk targets for acts of terrorism include military and civilian government facilities, international airports, large cities, and high-profile landmarks. Terrorists might also target large public gatherings, water and food supplies, utilities, and corporate centers. Further, terrorists are capable of spreading fear by sending explosives or chemical and biological agents through the mail."

U.S. National Counterterrorism Center
The U.S. National Counterterrorism Center (NCTC) define terrorism the same as United States Code 22 USC § 2656f(d)(2). The Center also defines a terrorist act as a "premeditated; perpetrated by a sub-national or clandestine agent; politically motivated, potentially including religious, philosophical, or culturally symbolic motivations; violent; and perpetrated against a non-combatant target."

U.S. national security strategy
In September 2002, the U.S. national security strategy defined terrorism as "premeditated, politically motivated violence against innocents." This definition did not exclude actions by the United States government and it was qualified some months later with "premeditated, politically motivated violence against noncombatant targets by subnational groups or clandestine agents".

USA PATRIOT Act of 2001
The USA PATRIOT Act of 2001 defines domestic terrorism as "activities that (A) involve acts dangerous to human life that are a violation of the criminal laws of the U.S. or of any state; (B) appear to be intended (i) to intimidate or coerce a civilian population; (ii) to influence the policy of a government by intimidation or coercion; or (iii) to affect the conduct of a government by mass destruction, assassination, or kidnapping; and (C) occur primarily within the territorial jurisdiction of the U.S."

Terrorism Risk Insurance Act
Section 102(1)(a) of the Terrorism Risk Insurance Act contains a definition of terrorism in order for insurance companies to provide coverage to all prospective policy holders at time of purchase and to all current policyholders at renewal and requires that the federal government pay 90 percent of covered terrorism losses exceeding the statutorily established deductible paid by the insurance company providing the coverage. It reads:

Insurance coverage
After the September 11 terrorist attacks in the U.S., many insurers made specific exclusions for terrorism in their policies, after global reinsurers withdrew from covering terrorism. Some governments introduced legislation to provide support for insurers in various ways.

In Australia, the Terrorism Insurance Act 2003 created a scheme to administer reinsurance scheme for insurance, relating to commercial properties and enterprises, but excluding residential properties, travel insurance, vehicles, and others. This legislation uses the same definition as specified in the Criminal Code (see above). The act's definition has  only been applied once, when in 2015 the Federal Treasurer declared the 2014 Lindt Café siege as a “declared terrorist incident” under the act, although there was some debate about the classification of this incident.
In the U.S., the Terrorism Risk Insurance Act (2002) provides a government reinsurance backstop in case of large-scale terrorist attacks, requiring that commercial insurers offer terrorism coverage for the types of insurance included in the act. This Act includes a definition of terrorism (see above).

Some insurance companies exclude terrorism from general property insurance. An insurance company may include a specific definition of terrorism as part of its policy, for the purpose of excluding at least some loss or damage caused by terrorism. For example, RAC Insurance in Western Australia defines terrorism thus:

Timeline of political definitions
Listed below are some of the historically important understandings of terror and terrorism, and enacted but non-universal definitions of the term:

 1795. "Government intimidation during the Reign of Terror in France." The general sense of "systematic use of terror as a policy" was first recorded in English in 1798.
 1916. Gustave LeBon: "Terrorization has always been employed by revolutionaries no less than by kings, as a means of impressing their enemies, and as an example to those who were doubtful about submitting to them...."
 1937. League of Nations convention language: "All criminal acts directed against a State and intended or calculated to create a state of terror in the minds of particular persons or a group of persons or the general public."
 1972, after the terrorist attack at the Olympic Games in Munich. UN General Assembly passed a resolution entitiled "Measures to prevent international terrorism which endangers or takes innocent human lives or jeopardises fundamental freedoms, and study of the underlying causes of those forms of terrorism and acts ofviolence which lie in misery, frustration, grievance and despair, and which cause some people to sacrifice human lives, including their own, in anattempt to effect radical changes". No consensu was reached.
 1987. A definition proposed by Iran at an international Islamic conference on terrorism: "Terrorism is an act carried out to achieve an inhuman and corrupt (mufsid) objective, and involving [a] threat to security of any kind, and violation of rights acknowledged by religion and mankind."
 1989. United States: premeditated, politically motivated violence perpetrated against noncombatant targets by sub-national groups or clandestine agents.
 1992. A definition proposed by Alex P. Schmid to the United Nations Crime Branch: "Act of Terrorism = Peacetime Equivalent of War Crime."
 1994/1996 United Nations General Assembly's 1994 Declaration on Measures to Eliminate International Terrorism, and 1996 Supplement, Paragraph 3:

 1996. UN General Assemby sets up an Ad Hoc Committee with the responsibility of drafting several conventions condemning various aspects of terrorism, as well as a final Comprehensive Convention to either supplement or replace the series of sectoral conventions.
 2002. European Union:

 2003. India: Referencing Schmid's 1992 proposal, the Supreme Court of India described terrorist acts as the "peacetime equivalents of war crimes."
 2014. Contained in a Saudi Arabia terrorism law taking effect 1 February 2014, the following definition has been criticized by Amnesty International and Human Rights Watch for being overly broad:
Any act carried out by an offender in furtherance of an individual or collective project, directly or indirectly, intended to disturb the public order of the state, or to shake the security of society, or the stability of the state, or to expose its national unity to danger, or to suspend the basic law of governance or some of its articles, or to insult the reputation of the state or its position, or to inflict damage upon one of its public utilities or its natural resources, or to attempt to force a governmental authority to carry out or prevent it from carrying out an action, or to threaten to carry out acts that lead to the named purposes or incite [these acts].

 2016. Brazilian anti-terrorism law:
Terrorism consists in the practice, by one or more individuals, of the acts listed in this article for reasons of xenophobia, discrimination or prejudice of race, color, ethnicity and religion, when committed with the objective of provoking social or generalized terror, exposing people, property, the public peace or the public safety.

Academic definitions by scholars
Numerous scholars have proposed working definitions of terrorism.

Schmid and Jongman (1988) counted 109 definitions of terrorism that covered a total of 22 different definitional elements, and Walter Laqueur counted over 100 definitions, concluding that the "only general characteristic generally agreed upon is that terrorism involves violence and the threat of violence". This is clearly inadequate, as many other actions involve both elements.

Bruce Hoffman (2006) has thus noted that:

Hoffman believes it is possible to identify some key characteristics of terrorism. He proposes that:

After surveying the various academic definitions of terrorism, Rhyl Vallis and others (2004) concluded that:

A definition proposed by Carsten Bockstette (2008), a German military officer serving at the George C. Marshall European Center for Security Studies, underlines the psychological and tactical aspects of terrorism:

Academics and practitioners may also be categorized by the definitions of terrorism that they use. A distinction can be made between "act-centric" and "actor-centric" definitions. Actor-centric definitions of terrorism emphasize the characteristics of the groups or individuals who use terrorism. Whilst act-centric definitions emphasize the unique aspects of terrorism from other acts of violence. Max Abrahms (2010) introduced the distinction between what he calls "terrorist lumpers" and "terrorist splitters."  Lumpers define terrorism broadly, brooking no distinction between this tactic and guerrilla warfare or civil war.  Terrorist splitters, by contrast, define terrorism narrowly, as the select use of violence against civilians for putative political gain.  As Abrahms notes, these two definitions yield different policy implications:

In 2011 Alex Schmid published an updated academic consensus definition in The Routledge Handbook of Terrorism Research, which includes additional discussion of the UN struggle to find a legal definition, and 260 other definitions. The revised definition includes 12 points, the first of which is:

Academic vs legal definition
Schmid returns to the problem of legal definition in an October 2020 article in Contemporary Voices, in which he reviews the history of the efforts to arriving at agreement on a common legal definition of terrorism and names six reasons underlying the challenges faced in achieving this. In a new major work edited by Schmid, Handbook of Terrorism Prevention and Preparedness (2020–2021), he states:

In contrast to a consensus on the legal definition however, the 2011 academic definition of terrorism, which is social-scientific rather than legal in nature, has gained a fair degree of acceptance among scholars.

Timeline of academic definitions

See also 
 -ism
 Bandenbekämpfung

Notes

References
Bockstette, Carsten  (December 2008). Jihadist Terrorist Use of Strategic Communication Management Techniques, George C. Marshall Center for European Security Studies no 20, p. 1-28 
Burgess, Mark. A Brief History of Terrorism, Center for Defense Information.
Cassese, A. (2002), International Law, Oxford University Press, 2002, 
Crenshaw, Martha, Terrorism in Context
Gardam, Judith Gail (1993). Non-combatant Immunity as a Norm of International Humanitarian, Martinus Nijhoff .
Griset, Pamala L. & Mahan, Sue (2003). Terrorism in perspective, SAGE, 2003, 
Hoffman, Bruce (1998). "Inside Terrorism" Columbia University Press 1998 .
Hoffman, Bruce (2006),Inside terrorism, Edition 2, Columbia University Press, 2006. , .
Khan, Ali (Washburn University - School of Law. 1987). A Theory of International Terrorism, Connecticut Law Review, Vol. 19, p. 945, 1987
Novotny, Daniel D. (2007). "What is Terrorism?" in: Linden, Edward V., ed. Focus on Terrorism 8, ch. 2, pp. 23–32..
Primoratz, Igor (2007/2011). "Terrorism". The Stanford Encyclopedia of Philosophy (Summer 2013 Edition), Edward N. Zalta (ed.). 
Record, Jeffrey (December 2003). Bounding the Global War on Terrorism, December 1, 2003 .
Smelser, Neil J.; et al. (2002). Terrorism: perspectives from the behavioral and social sciences, National Academies Press, 2002, 
Ticehurst, Rupert. The Martens Clause and the Laws of Armed Conflict 30 April 1997,  International Review of the Red Cross no 317, p. 125-134

External links
 Introductory note by A. Rohan Perera and procedural history note on the Declaration on Measures to Eliminate International Terrorism and the 1996 Supplementary Declaration thereto in the Historic Archives of the United Nations Audiovisual Library of International Law

Terrorism
 
International law